Gunshot residue (GSR), also known as cartridge discharge residue (CDR), gunfire residue (GFR), or firearm discharge residue (FDR), consists of all of the particles that are expelled from the muzzle of a gun following the discharge of a bullet. It is principally composed of burnt and unburnt particles from the explosive primer, the propellant (gunpowder), and vaporized lead. The act of firing a bullet incites a very violent explosive reaction that is contained within the barrel of the gun, which can cause the bullet, the barrel, or the cartridge to become chipped. Meaning gunshot residue may also included metal fragments from the cartridge casing, the bullets jacket, as well as any other dirt or residue contained within the barrel that could have become dislodged.

Law enforcement investigators will swab people's hands to look for gunshot residue if they are suspected to have discharged a firearm themselves or were in close contact with one at the time discharge. Gunshot residue does not travel very far because the particles produced are of a small size and small mass, causing them to lack momentum. Depending on the type of fire arm and ammunition used, it will typically travel no farther than 3–5 feet (0.9–1.5 meters) from the muzzle of the gun.

History
Before the use of the scanning electron microscope, hot paraffin wax was used to take a cast of the suspect’s hand. The cast was then sprayed with a reagent giving a coloration with nitro-compounds from the partially burnt and unburnt propellant particles. This approach, introduced in 1933 by Teodoro Gonzalez of the Mexico City Police Laboratory, is called dermal nitrate or paraffin test and is no longer used in casework.

In 1971 John Boehm presented some micrographs of gunshot residue particles found during the examination of bullet entrance holes using a scanning electron microscope. If the scanning electron microscope is equipped with an energy-dispersive X-ray spectroscopy detector, the chemical elements present in such particles, mainly lead, antimony and barium, can be identified.

In 1979 Wolten et al. proposed a classification of gunshot residue based on composition, morphology, and size. Four compositions were considered characteristic:
 Lead, antimony, and barium
 Barium, calcium, and silicon
 Antimony
 Barium
The authors proposed some rules about chemical elements that could also be present in these particles.

Wallace and McQuillan published a new classification of the gunshot residue particles in 1984. They labeled as unique particles those that contain lead, antimony, and barium, or that contain antimony and barium. Wallace and McQuillan also maintained that these particles could contain only some chemical elements.

Current practice
In the latest ASTM Standard Guide for GSR analysis by Scanning Electron Microscopy/Energy Dispersive X-ray spectrometry (SEM-EDX) particles containing lead, antimony and barium, and respecting some rules related to the morphology and to the presence of other elements are considered characteristic of GSR. The most definitive method to determine whether a particle is characteristic of or consistent with GSR is by its elemental profile. An approach to the identification of particles characteristic of or consistent with GSR is to compare the elemental profile of the recovered particulate with that collected from case-specific known source items, such as the recovered weapon, Cartridge cases or victim-related items whenever necessary. This approach was called ‘‘case by case’’ by Romolo and Margot in an article published in 2001. In 2010 Dalby et al. published the latest review on the subject and concluded that the adoption of a "case by case" approach to GSR analysis must be seen as preferable, in agreement with Romolo and Margot.

In light of similar particles produced from extraneous sources, both Mosher et al. (1998) aima et al. (2012) presented evidence of pyrotechnic particles that can be mistakenly identified as GSR. Both publications highlight that certain markers of exclusion and reference to the general population of collected particulate can help the expert in designating GSR-similar particles as firework-sourced.

Particle analysis by scanning electron microscope equipped with an energy-dispersive X-ray spectroscopy detector is the most powerful forensic tool that investigators can use to determine a subject's proximity to a discharging firearm or contact with a surface exposed to GSR (firearm, spent cartridge case, target hole). Test accuracy requires procedures that avoid secondary gunshot residue transfer from police officers onto subjects or items to be tested, and that avoid contamination in the laboratory.

The two main groups of specialists currently active on gunshot residue analysis are the Scientific Working Group for Gunshot Residue (SWGGSR) based in USA and the ENFSI EWG Firearms/GSR  Working Group based in Europe.

Results
A positive result for gunshot residue from SEM-EDX analysis can mean many things. Mainly it indicates that the person sampled was either in the vicinity of a gun when it was fired, handled a gun after it was fired, or touched something that was around the gun when it was fired. (For example: When a person goes to the aid of a victim of a gunshot wound, some gunshot residue particles can transfer from the victim.)

A negative result can mean that the person was nowhere near the gun when it was fired, or that they were near it but not close enough for gunshot residue to land on them, or it can mean that the gunshot residue deposited on them wore off.

Matching gunshot residue to a specific source
If the ammunition used was specifically tagged in some way by special elements, it is possible to know the cartridge used to produce the gunshot residue. Inference about the source of gunshot residue can be based on the examination of the particles found on a suspect and the population of particles found on the victim, in the firearm or in the cartridge case, as suggested by the ASTM Standard Guide for gunshot residue analysis by scanning electron microscopy/energy dispersive X-ray spectrometry. Advanced analytical techniques such as ion beam analysis (IBA), carried out after scanning electron microscopy, can support further information allowing one to infer about the source of gunshot residue particles. Christopher et al. showed as the grouping behaviour of different makes of ammunition can be determined using multivariate analysis. Bullets can be matched back to a gun using comparative ballistics.

Organic gunshot residue
Organic gunshot residue can be analysed by analytical techniques such as chromatography, capillary electrophoresis, and mass spectrometry.

Chemical Tests 
The Sodium Rhodizonate test

See also
 Blowback, material drawn into the barrel of a firearm post discharge

References

 ASTM E1588-10e1, Standard Guide for GSR analysis by Scanning Electron Microscopy/Energy Dispersive X-ray Spectrometry, American Society for Testing and Materials, West Conshohocken, PA, 2010.
 E. Boehm, Application of the SEM in forensic medicine, Scanning Electron Microscopy (1971) 553-560.
 M Christopher, J Warmenhoven, FS Romolo, M Donghi, R Webb, C Jeynes, NI Ward, A New Quantitative Method for Gunshot Residue Analysis by Ion Beam Analysis. Analyst, 2013, 138, 4649.
 O. Dalby, D. Butler, J.W. Birkett, Analysis of Gunshot Residue and Associated Materials—A Review, J. Forens. Sci. 55 (2010) 924-943.
 M. Grima, M. Butler, R. Hanson, A. Mohameden, Firework displays as sources of particles similar to gunshot residue, Science and Justice 52 (1) (2012) 49-57.
 H.H. Meng, B. Caddy, Gunshot residue analysis - review, J. Forens. Sci. 42 (1997) 553-570.
 P.V. Mosher, M.J. McVicar, E.D. Randall, E.H. Sild, Gunshot residue-similar particles produced by fireworks, Journal of the Canadian Society of Forens. Sci. 31 (3)(1998) 157–168.
 F.S. Romolo, M.E. Christopher, M. Donghi, L. Ripani, C. Jeynes, R.P. Webb, N.I. Ward, Integrated Ion Beam Analysis (IBA) in Gunshot Residue (GSR) characterisation. Forensic Sci. Int. 231 (2013), 219-228.
 F.S. Romolo. Advances in Analysis of Gunshot Residue.  In Emerging Technologies for the analysis of forensic traces, Edited by Simona Francese, Springer Publishing Company, pagine 183-202, .
 A.J. Schwoeble, D.L. Exline, Current Methods in Forensic Gunshot Residue Analysis, (2000) CRC Press LLC.
 J.S. Wallace, J. McQuillan, Discharge residues from cartridge-operated industrial tools, J. Forens. Sci. Soc. 24 (1984) 495-508.
 J.S. Wallace, Chemical Analysis of Firearms, Ammunition, and Gunshot Residue, (2008) CRC Press LLC.
 G.M. Wolten, R.S. Nesbitt, A.R. Calloway, G.L. Loper, P.F. Jones, Particle analysis for the detection of gunshot residue. I: Scanning electron microscopy/energy dispersive X-ray characterisation of hand deposits from firing, J. Forens. Sci. 24 (1979) 409-422.
 G.M. Wolten, R.S. Nesbitt, A.R. Calloway, G.L. Loper, Particle analysis for the detection of gunshot residue. II: occupational and environmental particles, J. Forens. Sci. 24 (1979) 423-430.
 G.M. Wolten, R.S. Nesbitt, A.R. Calloway, Particle analysis for the detection of gunshot residue. III: the case record, J. Forens. Sci. 24 (1979) 864-869.

External links
 New Scientist, 23 November 2005, "Why we cannot rely on firearm forensics"  (Archived copy)
  Scientific Working Group for Gunshot Residue (SWGGSR) http://www.swggsr.org/
  ENFSI EWG Firearms/GSR  Working Group http://www.enfsi.eu/about-enfsi/structure/working-groups/firearms-and-gsr
  Gunshot Powder Residue Test http://www.meditests.com/gun-powder-test.html

Forensic evidence
Gun violence